Bayi Town ( could refer to:

 Bayi, Nyingchi County, town in Nyingchi County, Tibet, China
 Bayi, Shenyang, town in Sujiatun District, Shenyang, Liaoning, China